Larceny on the Air is a 1937 American film directed by Irving Pichel.

Plot summary 
Dr. Lawrence Baxter runs a medical-themed radio show and frequently denounces the phony radium-based "medicine" being sold by Ronald Kennedy. After one of his patients is kidnapped by Kennedy's thugs, Baxter teams up with the police, and pretends to join Kennedy's business to gain evidence of criminal activity.

Cast 
Robert Livingston as Dr. Lawrence Baxter
Grace Bradley as Jean Sterling
Willard Robertson as Inspector "Mac" McDonald
Pierre Watkin as Kennedy
Smiley Burnette as Jimmy
Granville Bates as Prof. Rexford Sterling
William Newell as Andrews
Byron Foulger as Pete Andorka
Wilbur Mack as F. J. Thompson
Matty Fain as Burke
Josephine Whittell as Nurse Nelson
Charles Timblin as Swain
 Gonzalo Meroño as Richard Steward
Billy Griffith as Kellogg
William Hopper as Announcer
Frank Du Frane as Golden
Florence Gill as Spinster

Soundtrack

External links 

1937 films
1930s romantic thriller films
American crime thriller films
American black-and-white films
Republic Pictures films
Films directed by Irving Pichel
Films produced by Nat Levine
1930s crime thriller films
American romantic thriller films
1930s English-language films
1930s American films